Clarin, officially the Municipality of Clarin, is a 4th class municipality in the province of Misamis Occidental, Philippines. According to the 2020 census, it has a population of 39,356 people.

Geography

Climate

Barangays
Clarin is politically subdivided into 29 barangays. 

 Bernad
 Bito-on
 Cabunga-an
 Canibungan Daku
 Canibungan Putol
 Canipacan
 Dalingap
 Dela Paz
 Dolores
 Gata Daku
 Gata Diot
 Guba (Ozamis)
 Kinangay Norte
 Kinangay Sur
 Lapasan
 Lupagan
 Malibangcao
 Masabud
 Mialen
 Pan-ay
 Penacio
 Poblacion I
 Poblacion II
 Poblacion III
 Poblacion IV
 Segatic Daku
 Segatic Diot
 Sebasi
 Tinacla-an

Demographics

Economy

Most of the town's people earned their living through farming and fishing. Farming involves many rice fields that had been cultivated for the past years. Fishing provides both a lot of fishes and sea shells that were hiding in the deep areas of Panguil Bay.

References

External links
 [ Philippine Standard Geographic Code]
Philippine Census Information
Local Governance Performance Management System

Municipalities of Misamis Occidental